Matthew J. Adams is an archaeologist who specializes in the Near East. He earned his degrees at Pennsylvania State University and the University of California, Los Angeles, and is the director of the Albright Institute of Archaeological Research in Jerusalem and the president of American Archaeology Abroad, Inc. He has worked on several archaeological projects in the past, and is currently director of the Jezreel Valley Regional Project, Co-Director of the Megiddo Expedition along with Israel Finkelstein and Mario Martin, and co-director of the Solomon's Pools Archaeological Project with Mark Letteney.

The Albright Institute
Adams began his appointment as Director of the W.F. Albright Institute of Archaeological Research in June 2014. In 2020, he announced his retirement from the Directorship after his current term (ending July 2022), and the Institute initiated a search for his successor.

Published works

Books 
 Movement and Mobility Between Egypt and the Southern Levant in the Second Millennium BCE (ed. with Susan Cohen; Journal of Ancient Egyptian Interconnections 21; 2019).
 Rethinking Israel: Studies in the History and Archaeology of Ancient Israel in Honor of Israel Finkelstein (ed., with Oded Lipschits and Yuval Gadot; Winona Lake, Indiana: Eisenbrauns, 2017).
 The Books of Kings: Sources, Composition, Historiography and Reception (Assoc. Ed., with eds. Baruch Halpern and Andre Lemaire; VTSup, 129; The Formation and Interpretation of Old Testament Literature; Leiden: Brill, 2010)
 From Gods to God: Essays on the Social and Political Dynamics of Cosmologies in the Iron Age by Baruch Halpern (ed.; Forschungen zum Alten Testament, 63; Tübingen: Mohr-Siebeck; 2009).

Articles

The Shmunis Family Conversations in the Archaeology and History of Ancient Israel with Israel Finkelstein
The Shmunis Family Conversations in the Archaeology and History of Ancient Israel with Israel Finkelstein series is a YouTube series hosted by the W.F. Albright Institute of Archaeological Research's Albright Live YouTube Channel. As of March 2021, 10 episodes have been released with at least 22 episodes in development. The series is set as an interview-style conversation between Albright Institute Director Matthew J. Adams and archaeologist Israel Finkelstein. Episodes cover the rise of Ancient Israel as evidenced by archaeology, ancient Near Eastern textual sources, the Bible, and archaeology from the Late Bronze Age through the Hellenistic Period. The episodes are written and directed by Israel Finkelstein and Matthew J. Adams with cinematography and editing by Yuval Pan. The series is Produced by Djehuti Productions and the Albright Institute with a grant from the Shmunis Family Foundation.

References 

Year of birth missing (living people)
Living people